Mimachrostia fasciata is a moth of the family Erebidae first described by Shigero Sugi in 1982. It is known from North Korea, South Korea, the Japanese islands Hokkaido and Honshu and Tsushima, the Russian Far East and China. The habitat consists of rich broadleaved forests.

Adults have been found from May to September. There are probably several generations per year.

Description 
The wingspan is 13–15 mm for ssp. M. f. fasciata and 10–12 mm for ssp. M. f. minimus. The forewing is relatively narrow, light brown and often with an indistinct, narrow, beige reniform stigma. The antemedian and postmedian lines are well marked, waved and almost parallel. The subterminal line is weakly marked and the terminal line is marked by black interveinal spots. The hindwing is greyish brown with an indistinct discal spot.

Subspecies
Mimachrostia fasciata fasciata 
Mimachrostia fasciata minimus Fibiger, 2010 (Tsushima)

References 

Micronoctuini
Moths of Japan
Moths described in 1982